The 1987–88 Midland Football Combination season was the 51st in the history of Midland Football Combination, a football competition in England.

Premier Division

The Premier Division featured 17 clubs which competed in the division last season, along with two new clubs:
Leamington, relegated from the Southern Football League
Wilmcote, promoted from Division One

League table

References

1987–88
8